A statue of Ignacio Vallarta is installed along the Rotonda de los Jaliscienses Ilustres, in Centro, Guadalajara, in the Mexican state of Jalisco.

See also

 Statue of Ignacio Vallarta (Puerto Vallarta)

References

External links
 

Outdoor sculptures in Guadalajara
Rotonda de los Jaliscienses Ilustres
Sculptures of men in Mexico
Statues in Jalisco